Ud Aghaj (also Romanized as ‘Ūd Āghāj and Odāghāj; also known as Adāghāj) is a village in Khenejin Rural District, in the Central District of Komijan County, Markazi Province, Iran. At the 2006 census, its population was 69, in 14 families.

References 

Populated places in Komijan County